Liberale da Verona (1441–1526) was an Italian painter of the Renaissance period, active mainly in Verona.

In popular culture:

In the British TV series Inspector Morse, in the episode "The Death of the Self", the works of Liberale da Verona are subject to forgery.

Biography
He was a pupil of the painter Vincenzo di Stefano, although he was strongly influenced by Andrea Mantegna and Jacopo Bellini. He was featured in the Vite of Giorgio Vasari. In Verona, he painted an Adoration of the Magi in the Duomo, and another for the chapel in the bishopric. For the church of San Bernardino, he painted in the chapel of the company of the Maddalena. He also painted a Birth and Assumption of the Virgin. At the Brera Gallery, there is a St. Stephen. There are illuminated books by him in cathedral of Chiusi. The St Sebastian in the Princeton University Art Museum is attributed to Liberale.

He traveled to Siena to work in the Abbey of the monks of the Abbey of Monte Oliveto, where he illuminated a number of manuscripts.

Among the painters that are cited as his pupils are Giovanni and Giovanni Francesco Caroto; Francesco Torbido also known as il Moro; and Paolo Cavazzola.

Sources

1441 births
1526 deaths
15th-century Italian painters
Italian male painters
16th-century Italian painters
Painters from Verona
Italian Renaissance painters